The Nikaia Municipal Stadium or simple Nikaia stadium is a football stadium in the Piraeus suburb of Nikaia.

It is the main playing field for the local Proodeftiki F.C. playing team, and is colloquially known by the name "Proodeftiki Stadium".

It is located 2 km east of the Neapoli Stadium, home of the Proodeftiki's local rival Ionikos F.C.

References

Football venues in Greece
Sports venues in Attica
Nikaia-Agios Ioannis Rentis
Proodeftiki F.C.